Bachar Kouatly (Arabic: بشار قواتلي) (born 3 March 1958 in Damascus) is a French chess grandmaster, journalist and activist. He is  deputy president of FIDE.

He played three times for Lebanon in the World Junior Chess Championship (1975–1977), and represented Lebanon at the Chess Olympiad at La Valletta 1980. He won a zonal tournament at Qatar in 1981 and finished 14th at the 1982 Interzonal tournament in Toluca.

Kouatly won the French Chess Championship in 1979. He played for France in five Chess Olympiads (1982, 1984, 1986, 1988, and 1992).

He was awarded the titles of International Master in 1975 and Grandmaster in 1989.

Bachar Kouatly is an editor of Europe Échecs, a French–language chess magazine.

On December 10, 2016 he was elected President of the French Chess Federation. In 2018, he was elected the deputy president of the International Chess Federation.

References

External links

Bachar Koyatly chess games at 365Chess.com

1958 births
Living people
Chess grandmasters
French chess players
Lebanese chess players
People from Damascus